Bithoraxoid (bxd) is a long non-coding RNA found in Drosophila. It silences the expression of the Ultrabithorax (Ubx) gene by transcriptional interference.

References

Further reading

External links
 
 
 
 
 
 
 

Non-coding RNA